Manly Sea Life Sanctuary (formerly Oceanworld Manly) was a public aquarium located in Manly, Sydney, Australia. It featured sharks, giant stingrays, sea turtles, little penguins and other marine life. It also allowed guests to take part in Shark Dive Xtreme, where they could swim with grey nurse sharks over three metres long.

History
The sanctuary originally opened in 1965, as Marineland. It was refurbished and reopened in 1989 as Underwater world. It was purchased and renovated by Coral World International, and re-opened as Oceanworld in 1992. The aquarium was sold to the Sydney Aquarium Company (later Sydney Attractions Group) in 1999 to be operated as a branch of the Sydney Aquarium. In February 2008, Village Roadshow Theme Parks acquired the Sydney Attractions Group. In December 2010, Merlin Entertainments acquired the Sydney Attractions Group division of Village Roadshow Theme Parks. On 28 June 2012, the attraction officially relaunched as Manly Sea Life Sanctuary following a renovation which saw the addition of the Penguin Cove exhibit. It closed on 28 January 2018 due to projected maintenance costs.

Exhibits

Manly Sea Life Sanctuary was made up of three exhibits: Penguin Cove, Shark Harbour and Underwater Sydney.
 Penguin Cove – Manly Sea Life Sanctuary's newest exhibit. The exhibit was home to a colony of little penguins.
 Shark Harbour – a  aquarium that featured a variety of sharks, stingrays, turtles and tropical fish. An upcharge attraction known as Shark Dive Xtreme existed within this exhibit and allowed guests to swim with the sharks and other marine life.
 Underwater Sydney – a section of Manly Sea Life Sanctuary which featured rock pools, seahorses, octopus and lionfish.

References

External links
Official website

Aquaria in Australia
Defunct aquaria
Buildings and structures in Sydney
Manly, New South Wales
Merlin Entertainments Group
Sea Life Centres
Village Roadshow Theme Parks
Tourist attractions in Sydney
1965 establishments in Australia
2018 disestablishments in Australia
Zoos established in 1965
Zoos disestablished in 2018